The 2012–13 Notre Dame Fighting Irish men's basketball team represented the University of Notre Dame in the sport of basketball during the 2012–13 college basketball season.  The Fighting Irish competed in Division I of the National Collegiate Athletic Association (NCAA) and the Big East Conference. They were led by head coach Mike Brey, and played their home games at the Edmund P. Joyce Center Notre Dame, Indiana.

Previous season
The Fighting Irish finished the 2011–12 season 22–12, 13–5 in Big East play, finishing third place behind Champion Syracuse.  There were several Irish to receive All-Big East honors.  Junior Jack Cooley was named the Big East's Most Improved as well as was named 2nd Team All-Big East.

The Irish were defeated in the semifinals of the Big East tournament by Louisville. They earned a #7 seed for the NCAA tournament,  where they were eliminated in the second round by Xavier.

Pre-season

Following the end of the 2011–12 season, both Tim Abromaitis and Scott Martin applied to the NCAA for a sixth year of eligibility. Abromaitis had been a redshirt during the 2008–09 season, but suffered a torn ACL on November 25, 2011, during practice. He played in just two games during the season, having sat out the first four due to a misunderstanding of the rules during his redshirt season (he had played in exhibition games before the official start of the '08-'09 season).

Martin had transferred to Notre Dame after his freshman season at Purdue and sat out the 2008–2009 season due to NCAA transfer rules, but then suffered a torn ACL during a preseason practice in October 2009, causing him to miss a second full season. His petition for a sixth year was successful, but Abromaitis' was denied.

In June 2012, Notre Dame officially announced a 10-year contract extension for head coach Mike Brey, the third-winningest coach in school history  and, with the retirement of Connecticut's Jim Calhoun, now the second-longest tenured coach in the Big East after Jim Boeheim.

Notre Dame recruited three players from the high school senior class of 2011–12, each of whom signed letters-of-intent in November 2011. The recruiting class was rated 16th in the nation by Rivals.com:

Roster

 Brooks will redshirt in order to preserve a year of eligibility, which will be spent at another school after he graduates from Notre Dame. 
 Katenda, as he arrived at Notre Dame at the beginning of the 2012 Spring Semester, will not be eligible to play until the end of the 2012 Fall Semester.

Schedule and results

|-
!colspan=12 style="background:#002649; color:#CC9933;"| Exhibition

|-
!colspan=12 style="background:#002649; color:#CC9933;"| Non-conference regular season

|-
!colspan=12 style="background:#002649; color:#CC9933;"| Big East Regular Season

|-
!colspan=12 style="background:#002649;"| 2013 Big East tournament

|-
!colspan=12 style="background:#FFD700; color:#C41E3A;"| 2013 NCAA men's basketball tournament

Rankings

References

Notre Dame
Notre Dame Fighting Irish men's basketball seasons
Notre Dame
Notre Dame Fighting Irish men's basketball team
Notre Dame Fighting Irish men's basketball team